Palos Verdes Peninsula High School is a public high school in Rolling Hills Estates, Los Angeles County, California, United States.  As of 2023, it is a top-ranked school in the Los Angeles, CA Metro Area (#16) and California (#42), according to US News & World Report.

History

The school was formed in 1991 when Miraleste High School, Palos Verdes High School, and Rolling Hills High School were merged into a single high school. The former Rolling Hills High School campus (opened 1964) had the highest capacity and was used for the combined school.  When overcrowding became a problem after 1999, the Palos Verdes Peninsula Unified School District elected to re-open Palos Verdes High School in 2002.

Demographics 
In the 2021-22 year there were 2,338 students enrolled in Palos Verdes Peninsula High School. Enrollment by race/ethnicity was 39.09% Asian, 37.08% White, 12.49% Hispanic, 2.44% Black, and 8.9% other. Enrollment by gender was 49.87% male and 50.13% female.

Athletics
In 2014, as a senior, future major leaguer Eli Morgan had a 10–2 win–loss record with a 1.23 earned run average. He was named Bay League Co-Pitcher of the Year and All-California Interscholastic Federation First Team.

Extracurricular Activities and Programs 
Palos Verdes Peninsula High School offers a large variety of extracurricular activities including, but not limited to, Model United Nations, Speech & Debate, Mock Trial, CyberPatriots, FRC Robotics, Science Research, and Academic Decathlon.  Its Speech & Debate and Model United Nations programs are nationally ranked.

In October 2022, the school's Model United Nations program, together with Rotary Club of Palos Verdes Sunset and Rotary E-Club of District 2750 Tokyo Yoneyama, hosted the 1st Rotary Peace Conference with speakers such as Best Delegate CEO, Kevin Chan, and Ihor Kukhlevsky, a Ukrainian refugee. It was dedicated to bringing awareness to the atomic bombings in 1945 and nuclear weapons.  A tree from Heiwa (Hiroshima Survivor Trees) was planted by California Assemblymember, Al Muratsuchi, afterwards.

Notable alumni

Academics and writers
 Julie Otsuka, author
 Julie Reuben, historian
 Lauren Williams, mathematician

Entertainment and media

 Duane Chase, actor
 Duane Davis, actor
 Vince DiFiore, jazz trumpeter
 Liz Gateley, TV producer
 Stephanie Hsu, actress
 Joe Inoue, singer-songwriter, music producer, You Tuber 
 Lauren Iungerich, TV producer
 Jon Jafari, Youtuber
 Jirard Khalil, Youtuber
 Kellen Goff, voice actor
 Van Ling, special effects coordinator for motion pictures
 Tom Martin, TV writer
 Petros Papadakis, radio/television personality
 Debbi Peterson, member of The Bangles
 Vicki Peterson, member of The Bangles
 Lee Ritenour, jazz guitarist
 Yoko Yazawa, Japanese singer-songwriter

Sportspeople

 Bill Auberlen, professional race car driver
 Tracy Austin, professional tennis player
 Jay Bilas, ESPN commentator
 Dave Butler, NBA basketball player
 Greg Butler, NBA basketball player
 Whitney Engen, professional soccer player
 Clark Haggans, NFL football player
 Kevin Hartman, professional soccer player
 John Hennigan, WWE professional wrestler
 Scott Jackson, NFL football player
 Robin Leamy, 1984 Olympic gold medalist in swimming
 Erik Lorig (born 1986), NFL football player
 Eli Morgan (born 1996), MLB pitcher (Cleveland Indians)
 Merrill Moses (born 1977), Olympic water polo player
 Don Slaught (born 1958), MLB catcher 
 Craig Stevens, NFL player
 Eric Stevens, NFL player
 Steve Sharp, professional soccer player
 Shawn Weinstein (born 1985), Filipino-American professional basketball player
 John Welbourn, NFL football player

References

External links
 Palos Verdes Peninsula High School

Educational institutions established in 1964
High schools in Los Angeles County, California
Palos Verdes Peninsula Unified School District
Public high schools in California
1964 establishments in California